The Roman Catholic Diocese of Morogoro is a diocese located in the city of Morogoro in the Ecclesiastical province of Dar-es-Salaam in Tanzania.

History
 May 11, 1906: Established as Apostolic Vicariate of Central Zanguebar from the Apostolic Vicariate of Zanzibar
 December 21, 1906: Renamed as Apostolic Vicariate of Bagamoyo 
 March 25, 1953: Promoted as Diocese of Morogoro

Leadership
 Vicars Apostolic of Bagamoyo (Roman rite)
 Bishop François-Xavier Vogt, C.S.Sp. (1906.07.25 – 1923.05.19), appointed Vicar Apostolic of Cameroun
 Bishop Bartholomew Stanley Wilson, C.S.Sp. (1924.01.09 – 1933.05.23), appointed Vicar Apostolic of Sierra Leone
 Bishop Bernardo Gerardo Hilhorst, C.S.Sp. (1934.02.26 – 1953.03.25 see below)
 Bishops of Morogoro (Roman rite)
 Bishop Bernardo Gerardo Hilhorst, C.S.Sp. (see above 1953.03.25 – 1954.08.11)
 Bishop Herman Jan van Elswijk, C.S.Sp. (1954.07.18 – 1966.12.15)
 Bishop Adriani Mkoba (1966.12.15 – 1992.11.06)
 Bishop Telesphore Mkude (1993.04.05 – 2020.12.30)
 Fr. Lazarus Vitalis Msimbe S.D.S. (2019.02.13 – 2021.05.31) Apostolic administrator sede plena
 Bishop Lazarus Vitalis Msimbe S.D.S (2021.05.31 - present)

See also
Roman Catholicism in Tanzania

References

External links
 GCatholic.org
 Catholic Hierarchy

Morogoro
Christian organizations established in 1906
Morogoro
Roman Catholic dioceses and prelatures established in the 20th century
Morogoro, Roman Catholic Diocese of
1906 establishments in German East Africa